Thunder Road is a 2018 American comedy-drama film directed, written by, and starring Jim Cummings, based on his 2016 short film of the same name. Cummings also served as co-editor, composer and visual effects artist. It also stars Kendal Farr, Nican Robinson, Macon Blair, Jocelyn DeBoer, Chelsea Edmunson, Ammie Leonards, and Bill Wise. It won the Grand Jury Award at the 2018 SXSW Film Festival. The production began with a Kickstarter campaign.

Unlike the short, the feature version is neither shot in nor edited to appear as a single long-take, but it does employ the use of the technique in select scenes.

Plot

At his mother's funeral, police officer Jim Arnaud gives an awkward speech about her, and how she would sing the Bruce Springsteen song "Thunder Road" to him. Jim attempts to dance to the song, but his CD player malfunctions and he stumbles away in tears.

Aside from his mother's death, Jim is going through a rough divorce with his unfaithful wife Rosalind, as they are in a toxic custody battle for their young daughter Crystal, though Jim is willing to pursue joint custody. Jim ignores orders from his captain to take time off work and causes a public disturbance when he tackles a homeless man who assaulted him. The captain angrily sends him home where he spends his time off repairing a dance academy his mother used to run in an attempt to make money for him and his siblings and to preserve his mother's legacy. 
A few days later, Jim goes back to work, helping to catch a thief. One night, he drives a girl home after he finds her in a parking lot with two teenage boys.

Jim attempts to bond with Crystal, redecorating her room and learning a game she learned at school after struggling with it and becoming frustrated. Jim takes Crystal to school, but becomes upset when he discovers makeup applied to her face, telling her she does not need it to be one of the "pretty girls". After dropping her off, Jim notices Crystal hold hands with a boy, and sees the girl he drove home. 
Jim receives divorce papers while at work, with Rosalind seeking full custody of Crystal and planning to move away so that Jim will not be able to see her. Jim's friend at work, Nate, refers him to his former divorce lawyer, Donna. Jim confronts Crystal about the boy as he drops her off at Rosalind's house.

Jim and Nate go to stop an armed confrontation at a restaurant, and Jim becomes distraught after the man commits suicide. Later, Jim goes to see Crystal's teacher, Dustin Zahn. Zahn tells Jim that Crystal is disruptive and frequently uses expletives towards her classmates. Jim becomes extremely upset, and Zahn is forced to calm him down. During Jim's custody hearing, the judge accuses Jim of reckless behavior after a video of him dancing at the funeral is recovered and given to court. Despite Nate previously telling him he destroyed the person's phone, Jim loses the case.

Angered, Jim drives to the police station and confronts Nate. Nate theorizes that the video was recovered from the cloud, but the two fight in the parking lot, during which Jim pulls his gun from out of his holster without realizing it. Having witnessed this, the chief fires Jim and demands he give up his gun, badge, and uniform. While Jim strips, he goes on a volatile tirade about his co-workers. Without any useful clothing, a depressed Jim walks home in his underwear.

Nate visits Jim and finds him smoking in Crystal's old bedroom. The two of them drink and play baseball in Jim's yard, and Jim passes out in the yard after Nate leaves. The next morning, Jim packs his things and goes to his sister's house. The two talk about their families, and their mother, with Jim's sister revealing that, while working on a production of Swan Lake, their mother had suffered a severe knee injury that had led her to quit her dance academy years before, unable to admit that she was suffering immense pain from a surgery until she had ultimately destroyed her body.

Jim leaves and speaks to his mother at her gravestone. On his way home, he is pulled over by a police officer and escorted to Rosalind's house, where he finds that she has died from a drug overdose and Chris has gone missing, Crystal being the one who had to call the police. Speaking to Rosalind’s corpse, Jim tells her he has never hated her more than he has in this moment. He gently kisses her hand, stands up, and slaps her corpse in the face. Jim then comforts his daughter in the ambulance and tears up as he recalls Thunder Road once more as he asks her if she wants to move away and live with him.

Some time later, Jim and Crystal go to a performance of Swan Lake, and Crystal is awe-struck by the show; Jim cries tears of joy as he notices her receptiveness.

Cast

Reception 
The site's critical consensus reads: "Thunder Road deftly balances emotionally affecting drama against bruising comedy - and serves as an outstanding calling card for writer-director-star Jim Cummings." According to Metacritic, which sampled 17 critics and calculated a weighted average score of 79 out of 100, the film received "generally favorable reviews".

Owen Gleiberman of Variety wrote "This is one of the first dramas to dig deep into America's heartland crisis — the crush of the spirit that has emerged from a collapsing job market and drug addiction and the underlying loss of faith. In Thunder Road, Cummings creates an indelible character who is all tangled up in that disaster, but with a stubbornness that turns into something like valor, he wriggles free of it. He saves himself by becoming a human being. It's a relief to stop laughing at him, only to realize that you may want to cry for him." Alex Godfrey of Empire gave the film 4 stars out of 5, saying "Thunder Road is a tour de force turn from its creator, who delivers an unpredictable performance we've never quite seen before. Sat in the cinema, too close for comfort, you can't escape him, and, amazingly, you don't really want to. It is cringingly, rewardingly intimate."

David Fear of Rolling Stone called the film "an instant classic," saying "On paper, Thunder Road sounds like a hard sell — so we're supposed to sympathize with some God's Lonely Man type with unresolved anger issues, much less a possibly violent one with a badge? But Cummings lets you see how this fractured guy, someone who's trying to untangle a legacy of wrong turns and emotional instability, is trying to achieve some sort of peace and clarity through all of his clouded, fucked-up feelings as well."

Awards and nominations

References

External links 
 
 
 
 

2018 comedy-drama films
2018 independent films
American comedy-drama films
American independent films
Films about divorce
Films about drugs
Films about grieving
American police films
Films set in Texas
Films shot in Austin, Texas
Crowdfunded films
Features based on short films
Films directed by Jim Cummings (filmmaker)
2010s English-language films
2010s American films